Courtney Bruce (born 8 December 1993) is an Australian netball player. She was part of the Australian squad that won silver at the 2018 Commonwealth Games and was selected in the Australian Diamonds squad for the 2018/19 international season.

She grew up in the southern suburbs of Perth and attended Kelmscott Senior High School.

References

1993 births
Living people
Australian netball players
Australia international netball players
Netball players at the 2018 Commonwealth Games
Netball players at the 2022 Commonwealth Games
Commonwealth Games silver medallists for Australia
Commonwealth Games gold medallists for Australia
Commonwealth Games medallists in netball
2019 Netball World Cup players
Netball players from Western Australia
West Coast Fever players
Western Sting players
Suncorp Super Netball players
Australian Netball League players
Sportspeople from Perth, Western Australia
West Australian Netball League players
Australian Institute of Sport netball players
Australia international Fast5 players
Medallists at the 2018 Commonwealth Games
Medallists at the 2022 Commonwealth Games